Peter Michael Bergman (born June 11, 1953) is an American actor best known for his portrayals on soap operas, such as Cliff Warner on All My Children (1979–89) on ABC as well as Jack Abbott on The Young and the Restless (1989–present) on CBS.

Biography
The son of Walter Bergman, a United States Navy officer, he was born in Guantanamo Bay, Cuba. He later graduated from Crossland Senior High School in Camp Springs, Maryland. Bergman was married to actress and singer Christine Ebersole from 1976 to 1981. In 1985, he married Mariellen, with whom he has two children.

Career
Bergman originally auditioned for the All My Children role of Dr. Jeff Martin. His first notable role was his portrayal of Dr. Cliff Warner on All My Children, which he played from 1979 to 1987 and again from 1988-89. His character, Cliff, married Nina (Taylor Miller) four times (1980, 1982, 1986, and 1989) and divorced her three times.  

In a Vicks Formula 44 cough syrup advertising campaign in 1986, Bergman told the viewing audience, "I’m not a doctor, but I play one on TV." Chris Robinson, who played Dr. Rick Webber on ABC's General Hospital, was the original spokesperson in the ad campaign, which started in 1984. Bergman replaced Robinson after the latter experienced some legal difficulties. 

Since 1989, Bergman has played the role of Jack Abbott on The Young and the Restless. In 1997, Bergman portrayed Jack Abbott in an episode "The Heather Biblow story" on The Nanny, where he shared an on-screen kiss with Pamela Anderson. In 2001, he  guest starred as Jack on The King of Queens in an episode of Season 3. In 2015, Bergman also portrayed Marco Annicelli, the doppelganger of Jack, on The Young and the Restless.

Filmography

Awards and nominations

See also
Cliff Warner and Nina Cortlandt
Supercouple
Eric Braeden

References

External links

CBS: Y&R

1953 births
Living people
20th-century American male actors
21st-century American male actors
American male television actors
American male soap opera actors
Daytime Emmy Award winners
Daytime Emmy Award for Outstanding Lead Actor in a Drama Series winners
People from Guantánamo Province